The sawbwa barb (Sawbwa resplendens), also known as the Burmese rammy nose, Asian rummynose or rummynose rasbora,   is an endangered species of cyprinid fish in the monotypic genus Sawbwa. The species is endemic to Inle Lake in Myanmar (Burma). Mature males are iridescent silvery-blue with red snout and red lobes to the tail fin; females are duller without red and with a dark pigmentation spot by the anus. The sawbwa barb completely lacks scales.

References

Cyprinid fish of Asia
Endemic fauna of Myanmar
Fish described in 1918